Vital Albin (born 31 July 1998) is a Swiss cyclist, who specializes in cross-country mountain biking.

Major results

2016
 1st  Team relay, UEC European Championships
 1st  Cross-country, National Junior Championships
 2nd  Cross-country, UEC European Junior Championships
 3rd  Cross-country, UCI World Junior Championships
 3rd  Team relay, UCI World Championships
2019
 3rd  Cross-country, UCI World Under-23 Championships
2020
 2nd Overall UCI Under-23 XCO World Cup
3rd Nové Město I
3rd Nové Město II
 2nd  Cross-country, UEC European Under-23 Championships
2021
 2nd  Team relay, UEC European Championships
2022
 Swiss Bike Cup
1st Gränichen
 UCI XCC World Cup
3rd Leogang

References

External links

1998 births
Living people
Swiss male cyclists
Swiss mountain bikers